Denisa Spergerova (born 24 June 2000) is a Czech model and beauty pageant titleholder who won Miss Czech Republic 2019 and then represented Czech Republic at Miss World 2019 in London but unplaced. and 2020 she was chosen as Miss Grand Czech Republic 2020 which  her to represent the Czech Republic at the Miss Grand International 2020 pageant in Bangkok, Thailand. and she's Top 10.

As of 2019, she graduated from the Private Language High School, a school with the right to take the state language examination in České Budějovice (Economic Lyceum). She lives in Prague in an apartment that won in Miss Czech Republic in the Luka Living complex from Elite Bath.

References

External links

2000 births
Living people
Czech female models
Czech beauty pageant winners
Miss World 2019 delegates
People from České Budějovice
Miss Grand International contestants